Gilbert King may refer to:

 Gilbert King, pen name for Susie Frances Harrison (1839–1935), Canadian composer
 Gilbert King (author), American writer and photographer
 Gilbert Walter King, registrar and then judge of the British Supreme Court for China
 Gilbert King, multiple individuals receiving King Baronets in Charlestown, in the United Kingdom
 Gilbert King, chief of engineering at ITC, developer of an Automatic Language Translator system in the 1950s
 Gilbert King, Members of Parliament in 1709–1715, 1737–1747, and 1798 in Jamestown
 Gilbert, King of Hy-Many, 14th century relation of Tadhg Ó Cellaigh

See also
 John Gilbert King, Irish politician